Simplemente María (Simply Maria) may refer to:

Simplemente María (1969 telenovela), Peruvian
Simplemente María (1972 telenovela), Venezuelan
Simplemente María (1989 telenovela), Mexican
Simplemente María (2015 telenovela), Mexican telenovela based on Simplemente María of 1989 and produced by Ignacio Sada